Ifeoma Iheanacho (born 2 January 1988) is a female wrestler from Nigeria.

References

 bio on fila-wrestling.com

Nigerian female sport wrestlers
1988 births
Living people
World Wrestling Championships medalists
Commonwealth Games medallists in wrestling
Commonwealth Games bronze medallists for Nigeria
Wrestlers at the 2010 Commonwealth Games
21st-century Nigerian women
Medallists at the 2010 Commonwealth Games